The 2015–2016 Bryant Bulldogs men's basketball team represented Bryant University during the 2015–16 NCAA Division I men's basketball season. The team was led by eighth year head coach Tim O'Shea and played their home games at the Chace Athletic Center. They were members of the Northeast Conference. They finished the season 8–23, 5–13 in NEC play to finish in ninth place. They failed to qualify for the NEC tournament.

Roster

Schedule

|-
!colspan=9 style="background:#000000; color:#CCCC99;"| Non-conference regular season

|-
!colspan=9 style="background:#000000; color:#CCCC99;"| NEC regular season

References

Bryant Bulldogs men's basketball seasons
Bryant
Bryant
Bryant